is a Japanese light novel series written by Isuna Hasekura, with illustrations by Tetsuhiro Nabeshima. A manga adaptation illustrated by Arisaka Ako serialization in the June 2013 issue of Kadokawa Shoten's Young Ace.

Plot
It is a world where order is maintained by three great factions, the Church which bears the greatest authority, the Order of Clausius possessing influence on par with the Church, immense assets and military might, and lastly the Guild of Commerce, an association of merchants and artisans alike.

The alchemist Kusler who was captured and imprisoned because he committed the offense of trying to burn a saint's bones, sold his skills and talents to the Order of Clausius. Together with an old friend, Welland, they were then dispatched towards the town of Grubetti which was close to the front lines.

And then at a workshop in Grubetti which boasted advanced equipment due to being near the front lines, Kusler met the nun Fenesis who had introduced herself as a Monitor.

Characters

Main characters
 An alchemist who is sent to Grubetti after committing the crime of burning a saint's bones. He quickly grows interested in Fenesis and develops a crush on her. His name means "interest" 
 A nun who is a member of a tribe of human-animal-hybrids. Since her people are often victims of racist attacks, she keeps this part of her identity secret and hides her cat ears.
 A colleague of Kusler who tried to murder him multipe times before the series started. Is said to be a ladys man who often got into trouble for his behaviour and he even touched Fenesis' breasts against her will to prove she's still almost a child

Manga
A manga adaptation illustrated by Arisaka Ako serialization in the June 2013 issue of Kadokawa Shoten's Young Ace. The first volume was released on August 31, 2013.

The manga also received a German translation which was published by Panini Manga and renamed to Magdala de Nemure. The first volume was released in August 2014 and the last one in April 2016.

The French translation was released by Ototo Manga.

References

2013 manga
2012 Japanese novels
Dengeki Bunko
Kadokawa Shoten manga
Kadokawa Dwango franchises
Light novels
Seinen manga